Agostinho André Mendes de Carvalho (August 29, 1924 – February 13, 2014), known by the pseudonym Uanhenga Xitu, was an Angolan writer and nationalist. Xitu was born in Calomboloca, and in 2009 was the oldest member of the parliament for the MPLA party.

References

External links 
 Uanhenga Xitu homenageado pelo seu 87º aniversário
 		  	

Angolan writers
2014 deaths
1924 births
MPLA politicians
Members of the National Assembly (Angola)
Governors of Luanda
Health ministers of Angola
People from Bengo Province